The 14th Arizona State Legislature, consisting of the Arizona State Senate and the Arizona House of Representatives, was constituted in Phoenix from January 1, 1939, to December 31, 1940, during Robert Taylor Jones's first and only term as Governor of Arizona. The number of senators remained constant at 19, while the House increased from 51 to 52 members. The Democrats maintained one hundred percent of the senate seats, while the Republicans continued to have a single seat in the House, one of the two from Navajo County.

Sessions
The Legislature met for the regular session at the State Capitol in Phoenix on January 9, 1939; and adjourned on March 13. There was a special session which was held from September 23–27, 1940.

State Senate

Members

The asterisk (*) denotes members of the previous Legislature who continued in office as members of this Legislature.

House of Representatives

Members
The asterisk (*) denotes members of the previous Legislature who continued in office as members of this Legislature. The size of the House increased by a single seat to 52 members, when Maricopa was given a 19th seat.

References

Arizona legislative sessions
1939 in Arizona
1940 in Arizona
1939 U.S. legislative sessions
1940 U.S. legislative sessions